The Association of Franciscan Colleges and Universities (AFCU) is an association of over 20 Franciscan colleges and universities and is located in Milwaukee, Wisconsin. 

The group is varied, ranging from large and established universities, to junior colleges, to newer institutions. Most of the schools are located in what is now called the American Rust Belt, reflecting the activities of the Franciscan movement in the United States. Surprisingly, few Franciscan institutions are located in the Southwest, an area first settled by Franciscan missionaries.

Member institutions
 Alvernia University, Reading, Pennsylvania
 Alverno College, Milwaukee, Wisconsin
 Briar Cliff University, Sioux City, Iowa
 Cardinal Stritch University, Milwaukee, Wisconsin; the largest Franciscan university in America and home of the Association.
 Felician University, Lodi, New Jersey
 Franciscan School of Theology, Berkeley, California
 Franciscan University of Steubenville, Ohio
 Hilbert College, Hamburg, New York
 Lourdes University, Sylvania, Ohio
 Madonna University, Livonia, Michigan
 Marian University, Indianapolis, Indiana
 Neumann University, Aston, Pennsylvania
 Franciscan Missionaries of Our Lady University, Baton Rouge, Louisiana
 Quincy University, Quincy, Illinois
 St. Bonaventure University, Olean, New York
 Siena College, Loudonville, New York
 St. Francis College, Brooklyn, New York
 Saint Francis University, Loretto, Pennsylvania
 University of St. Francis, Joliet, Illinois
 University of Saint Francis, Fort Wayne, Indiana
 Villa Maria College, Buffalo, New York
 Viterbo University, La Crosse, Wisconsin
 The Franciscan Institute, Olean, New York

External links
 Official website

 
College and university associations and consortia in the United States